May Ooi Yu Fen (Ooi Yu Fen, born 24 June 1976) is a retired Singaporean butterfly, freestyle and medley swimmer. She competed in seven events at the 1992 Summer Olympics. She attended college at the University of Nevada, Reno from 1993 to 1997 and was a pre-med major. After her swimming career she became a MMA fighter.

References

External links
 
 

1976 births
Living people
Singaporean female butterfly swimmers
Singaporean female freestyle swimmers
Singaporean female medley swimmers
Olympic swimmers of Singapore
Swimmers at the 1992 Summer Olympics
Nevada Wolf Pack women's swimmers
Place of birth missing (living people)
Southeast Asian Games medalists in swimming
Southeast Asian Games gold medalists for Singapore
20th-century Singaporean women